Fulscot is a hamlet in South Moreton civil parish in South Oxfordshire, about  west of the village. In 1974 it was transferred from Berkshire. Fulscot consists mainly of a manor farm, and a few cottages on the road from South Moreton to the neighbouring town of Didcot.

External links

Villages in Oxfordshire